Jagdish Jandu is the chairman of Sri Ganganagar municipal council in Rajasthan, India. He was elected in November 2009 as an independent, although he is a former chairperson of the local Congress Party. His margin of victory over the Congress candidate was about 40,000 votes.

References

Living people
Year of birth missing (living people)
Indian National Congress politicians from Rajasthan